Garry O'Mahony (1933 – 24 October 2011) was an Irish Gaelic footballer who played for club side John Mitchels and at inter-county level with the Kerry senior football team.

Career

A member of the John Mitchels club, in Tralee, O'Mahony won his first County Championship title in 1952 before claiming a second title in 1959.  He first played for the Kerry senior football team during the 1953-54 league and succeeded in displacing Johnny Foley as the first-choice goalkeeper. O'Mahony won the first of back-to-back Munster Championship medals in 1954 and, after defeat by Meath in the 1954 All-Ireland final, claimed a winners' medal after lining out in goal in Kerry's defeat of Dublin in the 1955 All-Ireland final. He retained his position in goal for the opening round of the 1956 Munster Championship but lost his place to Donal Marcus O'Neill later that year.

Honours

John Mitchels
Kerry Senior Football Championship: 1952, 1959

Kerry
All-Ireland Senior Football Championship: 1955
Leinster Senior Football Championship: 1954, 1955

References

External links
Garry O'Mahony profile at the Terrace Talk website

1933 births
2011 deaths
John Mitchels (Kerry) Gaelic footballers
Kerry inter-county Gaelic footballers
Munster inter-provincial Gaelic footballers
Gaelic football goalkeepers